German submarine U-870 was a Type IXC/40 U-boat of Nazi Germany's Kriegsmarine built for service during the Second World War. She was ordered on 25 August 1941, and laid down on 29 April 1943 at Bremen, Germany. She was launched on 29 October 1943 and commissioned on 3 February 1944.

Design
German Type IXC/40 submarines were slightly larger than the original Type IXCs. U-870 had a displacement of  when at the surface and  while submerged. She had two shafts and two  propellers.

U-870 was fitted with six  torpedo tubes (four fitted at the bow and two at the stern), 22 torpedoes, one  SK C/32 naval gun, 180 rounds, and a  Flak M42 as well as two twin  C/30 anti-aircraft guns. The boat had a complement of forty-eight.

Service history
For her one patrol, she had one commander, Korvettenkapitän Ernst Hechler, who was awarded the Knight's Cross of the Iron Cross.
	
On 20 December 1944, U-870 attacked a small group of landing ships, damaging  and sinking the 1,625-tons vessel . The U-boat was then attacked by a British aircraft from No. 220 Squadron RAF but got away, also evading two hunter-killer groups of vessels.

Fate
She was sunk on 30 March 1945 at Bremen by US bombs.

Summary of raiding history

References

Notes

Citations

Bibliography

External links

German Type IX submarines
U-boats commissioned in 1944
1943 ships
World War II submarines of Germany
Ships built in Bremen (state)
U-boats sunk in 1945
U-boats sunk by British aircraft
Maritime incidents in March 1945